The East Iberian sand racer or East Iberian psammodromus (Psammodromus edwarsianus) is a species of lizards in the family Lacertidae. It is found in Spain and France.

References

Psammodromus
Reptiles described in 1829
Taxa named by Alfredo Dugès